Lucas Horton (originally Roberts) and Sami Brady are a fictional Supercouple on the American soap opera Days of Our Lives. Lucas is played by Bryan Dattilo and Sami is played by Alison Sweeney.  They are often referred to by the portmanteau "Lumi" (for Lucas and Sami) on internet message boards. They have two children together: Will Horton and Allie Horton, as well as a granddaughter, Arianna Horton, and grandson Henry Horton. TV Guide ranked the pairing in a list of soaps' best supercouples. They are known for their penchant for "scheming" against other characters.

Storylines
Sami and Lucas meet backstage at a rock concert. Austin Reed (Patrick Muldoon) gets Sami inside so she can  meet the singer Cherish. Sami slips into Cherish's dressing room where she discovers Lucas and Cherish having sex. Sami gets a good view of a shirtless Lucas before Cherish throws her out of the room and tells Lucas to get dressed. The next day Sami goes to Titan Publishing, where Kate Roberts (Deborah Adair) has just finished telling her friend Marlena Evans (Deidre Hall) that Lucas must never find out who his father is. Kate sees Sami - Marlena's daughter - and offers her a summer internship. Her first duty is to meet Kate's imminently arriving son, Lucas.

Lucas arrives late in his military academy uniform, but Sami doesn't notice as she is distracted by a phone call with her best friend, Jamie Caldwell (Miriam Parrish). She looks Lucas over but can't place where she has seen him before. When it dawns on her, she says "I know you. You're Lucas Roberts. You're not a goody-goody. You're a bad boy!"

Scheme dream team
Lucas and Sami are soon attracted to other people. Sami starts crushing on Austin while Lucas is interested in Sami's sister, Carrie (Christie Clark).

Lucas and Sami scheme to break up Austin and Carrie's relationship so they could have them for themselves. Because he agrees to help Sami, she helps Lucas find out who his real father is. His mother, Kate Roberts, told Lucas that his father was a West Point Academy graduate with a successful military career, but he knows she is lying. In return, Lucas agrees to take Sami to the spring fling dressed in his academy uniform to make Austin jealous.

Bill Horton is revealed as Lucas's father. Feeling betrayed, Lucas pushes his mother away and discovers the Hortons as his new family. 

Meanwhile, Sami gives up on having Austin and starts dating Alan Harris (Paul Kersey), who went to school with Lucas. Alan is obsessed with Carrie, but after his efforts to win her over are thwarted, Alan turns his rage on Sami. When Sami arrives at Alan's house to cook him dinner, he rapes her and takes her virginity. Lucas notices that Alan and Sami are behaving strangely. He corners Sami and asks her what happened. Sami admits the rape and tells Lucas the whole story. Afterward, Lucas physically confronts Alan and warns him to stay away from Sami. Lucas tries to get Alan's confession on tape for the rape trial. Lucas comforts Sami after some boys taunt her about the rape. Lucas and Sami make love and conceive their son, Will.

Soon after, Austin's sister, Billie Reed (Lisa Rinna), is put on trial for murdering her father Curtis Reed (Nick Benedict). Not only is Billie found to be innocent, but during the proceedings Lucas's mother, Kate Roberts, finds out the children she had with Curtis - Billie and Austin - are still alive, meaning Lucas has a brother and sister.

When Sami discovers she is pregnant, she claims the baby is Austin's (she had previously drugged Austin to have sex with him). Sami believes Austin is the father without even considering the possibility of Lucas being the father. Sami gives birth to William Robert Reed (played by Shawn and Taylor Carpenter). Lucas becomes very attached to his "nephew" Will. When Will is hospitalized after a near-drowning, Lucas discovers that he is Will's father. Sami tries to keep Will's real paternity a secret before her marriage to Austin, but Carrie discovers the truth. The secret is revealed on Austin and Sami's wedding day and the fallout results in Austin leaving Sami at the altar.

Antagonists 
Lucas wants custody of his son but Sami refuses, claiming she witnessed Lucas abusing Will. Sami gets a restraining order against Lucas.

Sami gets engaged to Franco Kelly (Victor Alfieri) so Franco can get a green card and stay in the country. Lucas does not want Franco to be Will's stepfather, and Lucas's mother Kate (now played by Lauren Koslow) tries to manipulate Franco into calling off the wedding.  Franco attacks Kate with a poker, nearly killing her. Lucas walks in and saves his mother's life by shooting Franco dead. Sami later comes across the body and faints near it. Kate frames Sami for the killing to send her to jail, giving Lucas full custody of Will. Meanwhile, a drunk Lucas kidnaps his son and gets into a car accident. The accident injures will, forcing him to undergo brain surgery. Sami gives custody of Will to Austin while in jail for Franco's murder. Sami is sentenced to death by lethal injection. Lucas falls in love with Nicole Walker (Arianne Zucker), but Nicole is in love with Sami's brother, Eric Brady (Jensen Ackles). Kate pays Nicole five million dollars for her to marry Lucas so he can gain custody of Will while Sami is in jail. Lucas's conscience, however, gets the better of him. At the last minute he rushes to stop Sami's execution by admitting to Franco's murder. The execution is halted, but not because of Lucas. Instead, a mobster associate of Franco sings a confession at the behest of Kate.

Sami is freed and falls in love with Brandon Walker (Matt Cedeño), who helps her regain full custody of Will from Lucas. They obtain proof that it was Lucas who killed Franco. Sami uses this information to blackmail Lucas – but it is Kate who forces Lucas to give up custody of his son. Losing Will absolutely destroys Lucas and he takes up drinking again. One night, while drunk, Lucas is caught in the fire that Kate set to kill Victor Kiriakis (John Aniston), and almost dies. After spending months in the hospital and then in rehabilitation, Lucas comes back to Salem, more determined than ever to hurt Sami.

Lucas soon gets a job working with Tony DiMera (Thaao Penghlis). He finds proof that Sami was involved in criminal activity – switching the paternity results on Lexie Carver's (Renée Jones) baby – and he uses this information to break up Brandon and Sami moments after their marriage, which is annulled. Lucas and Tony are celebrating at the DiMera mansion when Sami bursts in. During the ensuing scuffle, Tony throws Sami through the lounge's glass doors. She is taken to the hospital in critical condition, and Lucas goes to a bar to drown his sorrows. For the first time in years, he allows himself to remember the friendship he and Sami once shared as he waits to hear if she is going to live or die.

New beginnings, new challenges 
Lucas takes care of Sami after she is released from hospital, often against her wishes. As they spend more time together, Lucas finds his heart softening towards his one-time worst enemy. The two share a few platonic nights together, occasionally kissing. When Sami's father Roman (Josh Taylor) is apparently murdered, Lucas is there to comfort her. Lucas keeps his guard up as to not get Will's hopes up, and he still has not completely forgiven Sami. Lucas and Sami grow closer during the Salem Stalker serial killer storyline, ultimately professing their love for each other. They make love for the first time since Will's conception on April 3, 2004. Lucas successfully proposes to Sami on August 5, 2004, after singing "When a man loves a woman" to her in front of an audience at the Penthouse Grill.

Kate is not pleased. The night before their wedding, with the help of Eugenia, she drugs Sami and Brandon and places them in bed together. Lucas finds the setup and leaves Sami, devastating both of them. Sami's severely compromised psychological state deteriorates to the point where she becomes a secret transvestite under an assumed name, "Stan" (played by Dan Wells). Stan wreaks havoc on Salem for months, working for Tony DiMera, and selling illicit drugs to a pain-wracked John Black (Drake Hogestyn) – all out of a need for revenge.

Sami attempts to redeem herself. With Nicole's help, Sami is able to secure the evidence that Kate and Eugenia had set her up, and she convinces Lucas that she was never unfaithful. The two reunite and agree to marry once again. Moments before Lucas and Sami are to wed, Kate crashes the wedding and reveals to all that the havoc-wreaking Stan was Sami and Lucas leaves Sami again. Sami is shunned by everyone in Salem except for Austin, who had returned for the wedding. She lets Austin move into her apartment. In the meantime, Lucas pursues Carrie, who has also returned to Salem.

Lucas begins to date Carrie, and Sami begins to date Austin, and this leads to the eventual marriage of Lucas and Carrie, and the near marriage of Austin and Sami. But a mysterious gloved hand leaves a note that warns Sami not to go through with her wedding to Austin, or it will be revealed that Sami actually blackmailed Lexie into telling Carrie that she could not bear children.

Carrie cheats on Lucas almost instantaneously, and after Will (now Christopher Gerse) goes missing Lucas and Carrie split up. This allows Lucas and Sami to become closer. Eventually, Will turns up – he had just run away because he was embarrassed by Sami jilting Austin at the altar. But Sami's blackmailing of Lexie is revealed anyway. Everyone shuns Sami again. Lucas and Will move out. Austin and Carrie get back together and relocate to Switzerland.

Sami is attracted to her new Neighbour, EJ Wells (James Scott), and they kiss for the first time after her latest wedding disaster. Sami then discovers that not only is EJ the son of the villainous Stefano DiMera (Joseph Mascolo), but also that he is sleeping with Kate.

Marriage and Sami's twins 
Sami and Lucas reunite, and after getting caught in a snowstorm, make love. The roof of the cabin in which they've found sanctuary collapses on Lucas, trapping him. Sami goes to get help, flagging down a motorist who turns out to be EJ DiMera.  She tries to get out of the car, but he does not allow her, demanding at gunpoint that she help get him through a roadblock as she pleads for him to help her save Lucas.  After Sami helps EJ out, he tells Sami that he will only save Lucas if she has sex with him.  She is disgusted and immediately refers to his proposal as blackmail and rape, but she agreed to his terms because she feels that it is her only chance to save Lucas. EJ saves Lucas then runs off to Mexico.

Sami is expecting, and on May 9, 2007, to the delight of their son Will, Lucas and Sami are married.  At the reception a photo is revealed of Sami and EJ in Lexie Carver's car the night John Black was shot, and Lucas was trapped in the cave in. Sami is forced to tell everyone the truth. She is afraid that after the reveal, she will lose Lucas again, this time for good. She is surprised when he refuses to let it ruin the happiest day of their lives. Later at their apartment he tells her that there is no need to confess to him, because he trusts her.

On May 10, 2007, Sami tells Lucas all about the night of the accident and about agreeing to have sex with EJ. Lucas is enraged, immediately calling what EJ did to Sami "rape" and wants to go after EJ. Sami tells him if he does, the DiMeras would come after them. Lucas is completely understanding when Sami tells him that she only gave in to EJ to save Lucas's life. Lucas tells Sami that he is ashamed of the man he used to be, the one that had loved her and left her in the past, and because of that he thinks that Sami was afraid to come and tell him when EJ had started threatening her. Sami tells him that he isn't to blame, and that she is the one who has messed up time and time again.

On May 22, 2007, the psychic Celeste Perrault (Tanya Boyd), predicts that EJ DiMera is the father of Sami's baby. However, on June 18, 2007, Sami finds out that she is actually pregnant with twins. Sami has a paternity test, but thanks to Kate's blackmailing of Nick Fallon (Blake Berris) to create a false paternity report, EJ is believed to be the father of her twins for a number of weeks.  Then, in the episodes airing July 30 and 31, it is revealed that Lucas is apparently the father of both children.

On October 23, 2007, Sami gives birth to a girl and a boy – Allie Horton and Johnny. In another twist, there is another DNA test, and on November 2, Lucas learns that Johnny is really EJ's son.

Stefano promises to end the Brady/DiMera blood feud if Sami marries his son EJ; and in order to save lives and protect her family, Sami asks Lucas for a divorce. Lucas reluctantly agrees, and Sami and EJ are married in November 2007. Just after the ceremony is completed, EJ is shot in the back and temporarily paralyzed. Lucas sends Will to live in Switzerland with his uncle and aunt, Austin and Carrie, in order to protect him. Sami and Lucas remained sexually intimate despite her nominal marriage to EJ.

On December 20, Lucas tells Kate that he shot EJ. Despite Kate's protests, he confesses to the police and is sent to prison. Lucas tells Sami to get on with her life. He requests only that she stay away from EJ because he does not trust him. It is later revealed that it was actually Will who shot EJ, and Lucas confessed to protect his son. Whilst Lucas is in prison, EJ tries to take custody of Johnny, but as immigration wants to deport EJ, Sami moves into the DiMera mansion with Johnny and Allie, in order to prove that they are happily married couple. They later have sex, and Lucas, released on house arrest, sees them. Sami ends her marriage to EJ, but Lucas can't forgive her.

Friends and co-parents 
In March 2009 Lucas marries Chloe Lane (Nadia Bjorlin), though that relationship ends when she has an affair with Daniel Jonas (Shawn Christian). Sami begins seeing her former FBI bodyguard from the Witness Protection Program, Rafe Hernandez (Galen Gering), and becomes involved in a love triangle with him and EJ. Sami and Lucas become good friends again, and they amicably co-parent their son Will (now Dylan Patton) who has returned to Salem, and their daughter Allie. Lucas eventually gets a job offer in Hong Kong and moves there, though he does return for a few days for the funeral of his grandmother Alice Horton in June 2010.

On February 29, 2012, Sami calls Lucas for advice. On March 2, Lucas returns to Salem and goes to see Sami at her apartment. They admit to each other that they still love each other, and they share a hug. Lucas later reveals to Sami that he has a fiancé named Autumn, who Sami calls "Winter" and "April". Once Lucas finds out that Sami was the mole at Countess Wilhelmina, he promises to keep her secret. Stefano DiMera gives Sami the title of CEO at Countess Wilhelmina as revenge for his wife's Kate's affair with Ian McAllister. On April 23, Autumn breaks up with Lucas, via phone, saying she was sick of waiting on him to come back to Hong Kong.

On April 27, Lucas, Sami, Will (now Chandler Massey), and Allie have a fun day together as a family. Sami thanks Lucas for everything and gives him a hug. Lucas kisses her on the cheek, and bit by bit over the following weeks, Lucas and Sami become romantically involved again. But EJ sees them kissing and gets jealous. He talks about their kids and how if Lucas is in their life, they would get confused. With EJ as a competitor for Sami's affections, Lucas and Sami's new relationship does not last the summer, and on August 27, Lucas tells Sami officially that they are through. He refuses to listen to her especially after she runs away with EJ, but they decide to continue to work together as co-parents to Allie and Will. They are taken aback when their son Will comes out as gay, but later come around and support him.

On May 21, 2013, Sami and Lucas became grandparents to Arianna, Will's daughter with Gabi Hernandez; and on April 3, 2014, they are proud parents at the wedding of their son Will (now Guy Wilson), to Sonny Kiriakis (Freddie Smith).

Bereavement 
In October 2014, EJ is shot dead, and Lucas comforts Sami. In order to get the children away from Stefano, Sami relocates to California with Allie, Johnny, and Sydney (and Will and Arianna accompany them for the first few weeks).

On October 9, 2015, Will's body is found on the floor of his apartment in Salem. He has apparently been murdered (by strangulation), and the first responders declare that he is dead. Sami returns to Salem for Will's funeral. Sami and Lucas go to the morgue together and grieve over their son's body; they give eulogies at his funeral.

The Hunt for Will 
In October 2017, Sami returns again to Salem amidst rumours that Will is somehow still alive. She visits Will's grave, and Lucas finds her there, and they talk about Will and what is happening. Sami tells Lucas that Stefano DiMera's old associate, Dr Wilhelm Rolf, who has brought people back in the past, is the source of the claim that Will is alive. Sami is determined to find him, and to help Lucas, who in his grief has started drinking again. With the help of EJ's brothers, Rolf is tricked into coming to Salem, where Sami accosts him and tries to extract information. Rolf reveals he was the masked medical examiner that attended Will's body just after Sami and Lucas viewed it. He says Stefano "had nothing to do with Will's resurrection", but then kills himself before revealing his true employer. The Salem Police Department hack Rolf's computer and find the source of payments to Rolf's account is an address in Memphis. Sami persuades the police to give her the address, and flies off to Memphis with John, Marlena, Sonny and his current partner, Paul. Sami does not include or tell Lucas, as he is drinking and having hallucinations. Sami gets herself arrested when they break into the property, and Lucas, who has followed them to Memphis, goes to see her at the police station. Whilst concerned about her, he is furious with her for leaving him behind, and they argue. Sami implores him to seek help for his drinking and to help her, but he, not wanting to let himself believe Will is alive, walks out. Lucas goes to a bar to drink, where he actually sees Will (now Chandler Massey) but thinks he is hallucinating again. Will's father-in-law, the lawyer Justin Kiriakis, arranges for Sami's release – and she pursues leads on Will. However, they come to a dead end, and Sami and Lucas comfort each other before returning to Salem. Back in Salem, Sami is still discontent, and persuades Rafe to dig up Will's grave – and it is found to be empty. Sami flies back to Memphis and finds Will alive – but he has no memory of her or any of his family, or of his life before he was strangled. Will returns to Salem to find out about his former life, where Lucas and Will are re-united. Will meets his daughter, but even this does not trigger Will's memory. Sami is desperate to help Will remember and learning that re-living a traumatic event can trigger memory, she has Will strangled again in a re-staging of the original attack. Absolutely terrified, Will rejects his mom and gives up trying to remember; Lucas is furious at her for her actions. Then Sami's brother Eric helps mends fences between Will and Sami, and things calm down a bit. Lucas is still upset that Will cannot remember him and may never, so carries on drinking and ends up crashing his car whilst under influence. Both concerned and angry, Sami visits Lucas in hospital and, pulling out all the stops, helps Lucas draws strength from their shared love, encouraging him to take the first step towards sobriety, upon which he agrees to go to rehab. Sami and Will reconcile, but she realises her presence in Salem are not helping him, so she bids Will a loving good-bye and returns to her other children who are in Switzerland. Lucas returns from rehab, now sober, and despite Will's amnesia, begins building a new relationship with him.

See also
List of supercouples
Will Horton
Sami Brady and EJ DiMera

References

External links
Samantha "Sami" Brady @ SoapCentral.com
Lucas Horton @ SoapCentral.com

Roberts, Lucas and Sami Brady
Soap opera supercouples